General Talbot may refer to:

Dennis Talbot (British Army officer) (1908–1994), British Army major general
John Talbot, 1st Earl of Shrewsbury (c. 1387–1453), English Army general
Norman Talbot (1914–1979), British Army lieutenant general
Reginald Talbot (1841–1929), British Army major general
Glenn Talbot (Marvel Cinematic Universe), appearing in TV series Agents of S.H.I.E.L.D. as General Talbot

See also
Bud Talbott (1892–1952), U.S. Air Force brigadier general
Carlos Talbott (1920–2015), U.S. Air Force lieutenant general